All India Radio is an Australian electronic band. Their style includes genres such as lo-fi, downtempo and instrumental. They are a partially live band and partially studio-based project. The founding (and constant) member of the band is Martin Kennedy. Their debut album, The Inevitable was released in 1999.

All India Radio have had their music featured in film and TV including CSI: Miami, One Tree Hill, Sicko, Till Human Voices Wake Us, Big Brother Australia, Bondi Rescue and Recruits. Kennedy, with All India Radio and Steve Kilbey, provided the original soundtrack music for the Australian post-apocalypse film, The Rare Earth.

Wired Magazine has stated that "Since the turn of the 21st century, All India Radio has mashed the ambient-hop signatures of DJ Shadow, Tortoise and Thievery Corporation with the instantly recognizable guitar sound tracking of Ennio Morricone and Angelo Badalamenti. The resulting narcotic musical textures are capable of floating listeners to galaxies far, far away."

All India Radio's self-titled third album was nominated for an Australian Recording Industry Award (ARIA) Award in 2003, and the band has worked with Steve Kilbey (The Church), Graham Lee (The Triffids), Ed Kuepper (The Saints and now Nick Cave and The Bad Seeds) and David Bridie (Not Drowning, Waving) among others.

All India Radio's 19th studio album The Generator of All Infinity was released in September 2022.

Discography

Albums

Awards and nominations

ARIA Music Awards
The ARIA Music Awards is an annual awards ceremony that recognises excellence, innovation, and achievement across all genres of Australian music. They commenced in 1987.

! 
|-
| 2003
| All India Radio
| ARIA Award for Best World Music Album
| 
| 
|-

External links

References

Australian electronic musicians
Australian techno groups
Downtempo musicians
Musicians from Tasmania